Popstars was a singing competition series in the Netherlands. The first season started on 22 August 2008. A second season was aired for 2009-2010 and third season aired in 2010-2011. The winners in season 1 were RED! made up of the three finalist winners Brandi Russell, Steffie Zoontjes and Deon Leon. Wesley Klein won in season 2 and Dean Saunders in season 3.

The precursor of these shows was the Dutch version of Popstars: The Rivals broadcast on RTL 4 in 2004 hosted by Beau van Erven Dorens. The series was won by the boy band Men2B (male category) and girl band Raffish (female category). Both disbanded in 2006.

Summary

Season 1 (2008)
Participants and elimination table

Season 2 (2009-2010)
Participants and elimination table:

Season 3 (2010-2011)
The schedules for season 3 were as follows:
9 Auditions: 9, 16, 23 and 30 July 2010, 6, 13, 20 and 27 August 2010 and 10 September 2010
6 Continued rounds: 17 and 24 September 2010, 1, 11, 18 and 25 October 2010
Top 25 solos: 1 November 2010
2 Selection liveshows 1: 8 and 15 November 2010
6 Liveshows: 22 and 29 November 2010, 6, 13, 20 and 27 December 2010
The hosts were Nancy Coolen (all rounds), Gerard Joling (only during auditions) and Tooske Ragas (only during liveshows).

Participants: The winner of the third season was Dean Saunders, with Simone Nijssen as runner-up. Final classification:
1. Dean Saunders - winner
2. Simone Nijssen
3. Sharon Kips
4. Darien Solange Kastaneer
5. Carlijn Middelhof
6. Angela Slagt
6. Bertha Verbeek
6. Rody Valks
6. Sam Lebens
10. Søren Jørgensen
11. René Klein
12. Ephraim Beks
13. Samantha Klumper
14. Valerie Van Krimpen

Discography

Singles 

|- align=center
|align=left|(RED!) Step Into the Light||19-12-2008||27-12-2008||tip2||-||#1 in de Single Top 100
|- align=center
|align=left|(RED!) Guilty||01-05-2009||-||||||
|- align=center
|align=left|(RED!) Conga||11-07-2009||-||||||#42 in de Single Top 100
|- align=center
|align=left|(Wesley Klein) You Raise Me Up||29-01-2010||13-02-2010||4||11||#1 in de Single Top 100
|- align=center
|align=left|(Rebecca Schouw) All Your Talk||15-03-2010||-||||||#91 in de Single Top 100
|- align=center
|align=left|(Wesley Klein) Een ongelofelijke droom||19-03-2010||03-04-2010||tip2||-||#2 in de Single Top 100
|- align=center
|align=left|(Dean Saunders) You and I Both||22-01-2011||05-02-2011||22||4||#1 in de Single Top 100
|}

See also
So You Wanna Be a Popstar (Netherlands)

External links
Official website

Popstars
Dutch music television series
2008 Dutch television series debuts
Dutch-language television shows
Dutch reality television series
Non-New Zealand television series based on New Zealand television series
SBS6 original programming